Hank Cheyne (born August 13, 1958) is an American actor and former lawyer known for playing Ricardo Torres in the soap opera Sunset Beach (1997–1999). He also played the role of Scott LaSalle on Another World (1986–1988) and Anton Vargas on Saints & Sinners.

Early life and education 
Born Henry Edward Garcia in Santa Maria, California, Cheyne graduated from Santa Clara University in 1980 with a Bachelor of Science degree in business, where he also played varsity baseball. After graduating from Santa Clara, he attended and graduated from UCLA School of Law.

Career 
While still in law school, Cheyne worked as a model in Milan, where he was discovered by an acting coach. After passing the California bar exam, Cheyne worked for a law firm in Beverly Hills, California, and began pursuing a career as an actor.

Personal life 
He took "Cheyne" as his stage name from the town Cheyenne, Wyoming, which is where his parents met. Cheyne's grandfather was full-blooded Yaqui Indian.

Filmography

Film

Television

References

External links

Living people
American male soap opera actors
Santa Clara University alumni
Native American male actors
1958 births
People from Santa Maria, California
Actors from California
Yaqui people
20th-century Native Americans
21st-century Native Americans